Rescue is an album by the guitarist Sanjay Mishra. It was released in 2000.

Track listing
"Rescue" (Sanjay Mishra) – 4:13
"Crossover" (Mishra) – 5:43
"Firefly" (Mishra) – 5:02
"Stoneflower Morning" (Miti) – 5:17
"Norwegian Wood" (John Lennon, Paul McCartney) – 4:18
"Kaliedescope" (Mishra) – 7:40
"Purnima" (Mishra) – 3:02
"The Eighth" (Mishra) – 4:52
"Gymnopedie" (Eric Satie) – 3:25

Personnel

Musicians
Sanjay Mishra – guitar and programming
Dennis Chambers – drums
Samir Chatterjee – tabla
Bill Kratz – bass
Ramesh Mishra – sarangi
John Gnorski – dobro on "Purnima"
Broto Roy – frame drum on "Kaleidoscope"

Production
Miti – engineer

References

2000 albums
Sanjay Mishra albums